The Memorial World Tour was a concert tour by American heavy metal band Slipknot in honor of late bassist Paul Gray who died on May 24, 2010. The tour was the group's first since the All Hope Is Gone World Tour which ended in 2009. The tour consisted mostly of festival dates and a small number of headlining appearances.

The band headlined the Sonisphere Festival in Finland, France, Sweden and the United Kingdom and co-headlined the festival in Greece, Turkey, Switzerland and Italy with Iron Maiden. They also headlined the Graspop Metal Meeting festival in Belgium. Finally, the band closed off 2011 by performing at the Rock in Rio festival held in Brazil alongside acts such as Metallica, Sepultura and others.

Drummer Joey Jordison announced that a live bassist, later confirmed as former Slipknot guitarist Donnie Steele, would fill in for Gray but would not be visible by the audience, instead performing behind Jordison. Vocalist Corey Taylor stated that he was willing to perform the shows for the fans, but at the time was hesitant about recording another Slipknot album in the near future due to the absence of Gray and his involvement with Stone Sour. Taylor doubted the future of Slipknot if the upcoming shows were unsuccessful. Percussionist Shawn Crahan along with Taylor both expressed interest in bringing the tour to the United States. Corey Taylor later confirmed via Twitter that a U.S. leg of the tour was planned.

The band scheduled three headlining shows of their own on the European leg, two shows in Russia and the latter in Berlin, Germany to compensate for the cancellation of the Bulgarian edition of the Sonisphere Festival.

On February 8, 2012, it was announced Slipknot would be returning to North America for the Mayhem Festival tour of 2012. Before the first show of the tour, it was reported that guitarist Jim Root would have to sit out multiple dates after his appendix had burst. On July 13, Root recovered and returned to the band.

In the ongoing tour, the band members also wore their red jumpsuits from the self-titled album. Sid, Chris, and Shawn wore their old self-titled masks for the whole show. Corey and Jim wore their self-titled masks for half of the show and wore their All Hope Is Gone masks for the other half. Mick, Joey, and Craig wore their All Hope Is Gone masks for the whole show.  An effigy of Paul Gray stood between Craig and Joey's drum kit. The effigy included Paul's self-titled mask, his self-titled jumpsuit and his left-handed bass guitar beside it. For the American leg of the tour, they wore their red Iowa jumpsuits along with some matching to their Iowa masks. This was the last Slipknot tour to feature drummer Joey Jordison before he was fired from the band in December 2013.

Tour dates

 1^ Sonisphere Festival appearance.
 2^ Headline dates, non Soundwave Festival appearance.

Cancellations

Setlist
The setlist for the tour is composed mainly of songs from the band's debut album, Slipknot, to coincide with the stage set and apparel used on stage. The majority of the songs performed on the tour were written by or had a significant contribution in the writing process by former bassist Paul Gray.

Gently from the album Iowa was also played in 2012 only in the United States not in Australia

After each time a concert ends, the members, as a tribute to Paul, stand beside his effigy for a few minutes while "'Til We Die" is being played in the background.

Personnel
(#0) Sid Wilson – turntables
(#1) Joey Jordison – drums
(#3) Chris Fehn – percussion, backing vocals
(#4) Jim Root – guitars
(#5) Craig Jones – sampling, media
(#6) Shawn Crahan – percussion, backing vocals
(#7) Mick Thomson – guitars
(#8) Corey Taylor – lead vocals
Donnie Steele – bass (Off stage)

External links
Official website

References

Slipknot (band) concert tours
2011 concert tours
2012 concert tours